Lucas Ademar Bernardi (born 27 September 1977) is an Argentine former professional footballer and manager. He played as a defensive midfielder.

Club career
Bernardi began his playing career with Newell's Old Boys before joining French team Olympique de Marseille in 2001. After one season with Marseille he joined AS Monaco where he played over 200 games for the club. He was part of the team that reached the final of the 2003–04 UEFA Champions League. In 2009, he returned to Argentina to rejoin Newell's.

International career
Bernardi made his international debut for Argentina against Japan in 2004.

Coaching career
On 3 March 2019, Bernardi was appointed as manager of Godoy Cruz.

Career statistics

Club

International

Managerial
.

Honours
Monaco
Coupe de la Ligue 2002–03
UEFA Champions League: Runner-up 2003–04

Newell's Old Boys
Argentine Primera División 2012–13

References

External links
 
 
 

Living people
1977 births
Footballers from Rosario, Santa Fe
Association football midfielders
Argentine footballers
Argentina international footballers
Newell's Old Boys footballers
Olympique de Marseille players
AS Monaco FC players
Expatriate footballers in France
Ligue 1 players
Argentine Primera División players
Argentine Primera División managers
Argentine expatriate footballers
Expatriate footballers in Monaco
2005 FIFA Confederations Cup players
Argentine expatriate sportspeople in France
Argentine expatriate sportspeople in Monaco
Argentine sportspeople of Italian descent
Citizens of Italy through descent
Argentine football managers
Newell's Old Boys managers
Arsenal de Sarandí managers
Godoy Cruz Antonio Tomba managers
Estudiantes de La Plata managers